Coleophora echinopsilonella is a moth of the family Coleophoridae. It is found in Algeria, Libya and Tunisia.

The larvae feed on Bassia muricata. They feed on the leaves of their host plant.

References

echinopsilonella
Moths described in 1915
Moths of Africa